Kwandwe Private Game Reserve is a private game reserve, northeast of Grahamstown, Eastern Cape, South Africa. The name Kwandwe means Place of the Blue Crane in the local language. Mammals such as Black wildebeest, Black Rhino, Cape grysbok and Black-footed cat are found on the reserve as well as bird species including Blue crane, Knysna woodpecker and Crowned eagle.

Climate 
The January maximum temperature varies between 28°C and 32°C, while the July maximum temperature goes between 21°C and 25°C. The July minimum temperature is 2°C to 5°C. Rainfall fluctuates between 236 mm and 560 mm per year.

References 

 Stuart, Chris & Mathilde (2012). National Parks and Nature Reserves. Struik Travel and Heritage. .

Nature reserves in South Africa